Hadan station may refer to:

 Hadan station (Busan Metro), in Busan, South Korea
 Hadan station (Pyongui Line), in Chŏngju, North Korea